Etomidate (USAN, INN, BAN; marketed as Amidate) is a short-acting intravenous anaesthetic agent used for the induction of general anaesthesia and sedation for short procedures such as reduction of dislocated joints, tracheal intubation, cardioversion and electroconvulsive therapy. It was developed at Janssen Pharmaceutica in 1964 and was introduced as an intravenous agent in 1972 in Europe and in 1983 in the United States.

The most common side effects include venous pain on injection and skeletal muscle movements.

Medical uses

Sedation and anesthesia
In emergency settings, etomidate can be used as a sedative hypnotic agent. It is used for conscious sedation and as a part of a rapid sequence induction to induce anaesthesia. It is used as an anaesthetic agent since it has a rapid onset of action and a safe cardiovascular risk profile, and therefore is less likely to cause a significant drop in blood pressure than other induction agents. In addition, etomidate is often used because of its easy dosing profile, limited suppression of ventilation, lack of histamine liberation and protection from myocardial and cerebral ischemia. Thus, etomidate is a good induction agent for people who are hemodynamically unstable. Etomidate also has interesting characteristics for people with traumatic brain injury because it is one of the only anesthetic agents able to decrease intracranial pressure and maintain a normal arterial pressure.

In those with sepsis, one dose of the medication does not appear to affect the risk of death.

Speech and memory test
Another use for etomidate is to determine speech lateralization in people prior to performing lobectomies to remove epileptogenic centres in the brain. This is called the etomidate speech and memory test, or eSAM, and is used at the Montreal Neurological Institute. However, only retrospective cohort studies support the use and safety of etomidate for this test.

Steroidogenesis inhibitor
In addition to its action and use as an anesthetic, etomidate has also been found to directly inhibit the enzymatic biosynthesis of steroid hormones, including corticosteroids in the adrenal gland. As the only adrenal steroidogenesis inhibitor available for intravenous or parenteral administration, it is useful in situations in which rapid control of hypercortisolism is necessary or in which oral administration is unfeasible.

Use in executions
The U.S. state of Florida used the drug in a death penalty procedure when Mark James Asay, 53, was executed on August 24, 2017. He became the first person in the U.S. to be executed with etomidate as one of the drugs. Etomidate replaces midazolam as the sedative. Drug companies have made it harder to buy midazolam for executions. The etomidate was followed by rocuronium bromide, a paralytic, and finally, potassium acetate in place of the commonly used potassium chloride injection to stop the heart. Potassium acetate was first used for this purpose inadvertently in a 2015 execution in Oklahoma.

Adverse effects
Etomidate suppresses corticosteroid synthesis in the adrenal cortex by reversibly inhibiting 11β-hydroxylase, an enzyme important in adrenal steroid production; it leads to primary adrenal suppression. Using a continuous etomidate infusion for sedation of critically ill trauma patients in intensive care units has been associated with increased mortality due to adrenal suppression. Continuous intravenous administration of etomidate leads to adrenocortical dysfunction.  The mortality of patients exposed to a continuous infusion of etomidate for more than 5 days increased from 25% to 44%, mainly due to infectious causes such as pneumonia.

Because of etomidate-induced adrenal suppression, its use for patients with sepsis is controversial. Cortisol levels have been reported to be suppressed up to 72 hours after a single bolus of etomidate in this population at risk for adrenal insufficiency. For this reason, many authors have suggested that etomidate should never be used for critically ill patients with septic shock because it could increase mortality. However, other authors continue to defend etomidate's use for septic patients because of etomidate's safe hemodynamic profile and lack of clear evidence of harm. A study by Jabre et al. showed that a single dose of etomidate used for Rapid Sequence Induction prior to endrotracheal intubation has no effect on mortality compared to ketamine even though etomidate did cause transient adrenal suppression. In addition, a recent meta-analysis done by Hohl could not conclude that etomidate increased mortality. The authors of this meta-analysis concluded more studies were needed because of lack of statistical power to conclude definitively about the effect of etomidate on mortality. Thus, Hohl suggests a burden to prove etomidate is safe for use in septic patients, and more research is needed before it is used. Other authors  advise giving a prophylactic dose of steroids (e.g. hydrocortisone) if etomidate is used, but only one small prospective controlled study in patients undergoing colorectal surgery has verified the safety of giving stress dose corticosteroids to all patients receiving etomidate.

In a retrospective review of almost 32,000 people, etomidate, when used for the induction of anaesthesia, was associated 2.5-fold increase in the risk of dying compared with those given propofol. People given etomidate also had significantly greater odds of having cardiovascular morbidity and significantly longer hospital stay. These results, especially given the large size of study, strongly suggest that, at the very least, clinicians should use etomidate judiciously. However, given this is a retrospective study, it is clearly misinterpreting how etomidate is typically used: etomidate is a drug that is reserved for sicker patients whom may not tolerate the more severe hemodynamic liability (towards lower mean pressures) and, thus the bias of this retrospective study is inconclusive, at best.

In people with traumatic brain injury, etomidate use is associated with a blunting of an ACTH stimulation test. The clinical impact of this effect has yet to be determined.

In addition, concurrent use of etomidate with opioids and/or benzodiazepines, is hypothesized to exacerbate etomidate-related adrenal insufficiency. However, only retrospective evidence of this effect exists and prospective studies are needed to measure the clinical impact of this interaction.

Etomidate is associated with a high incidence of burning on injection, postoperative nausea and vomiting, and superficial thrombophlebitis (with rates higher than propofol).

Pharmacology

Pharmacodynamics
(R)-Etomidate is tenfold more potent than its (S)-enantiomer. At low concentrations (R)-etomidate is a modulator at GABAA receptors containing β2 and β3 subunits. At higher concentrations, it can elicit currents in the absence of GABA and behaves as an allosteric agonist. Its binding site is located in the transmembrane section of this receptor between the beta and alpha subunits (β+α−). β3-containing GABAA receptors are involved in the anesthetic actions of etomidate, while the β2-containing receptors are involved in some of the sedation and other actions that can be elicited by this drug.

Pharmacokinetics
At the typical dose, anesthesia is induced for the duration of about 5–10 minutes, though the half-life of drug metabolism is about 75 minutes, because etomidate is redistributed from the plasma to other tissues.
 Onset of action: 30–60 seconds
 Peak effect: 1 minute
 Duration: 3–5 minutes; terminated by redistribution
 Distribution: Vd: 2–4.5 L/kg
 Protein binding: 76%
 Metabolism: Hepatic and plasma esterases
 Half-life distribution: 2.7 minutes
 Half-life redistribution: 29 minutes
 Half-life elimination: 2.9 to 5.3 hours

Metabolism
Etomidate is highly protein-bound in blood plasma and is metabolised by hepatic and plasma esterases to inactive products. It exhibits a biexponential decline.

Formulation
Etomidate is usually presented as a clear colourless solution for injection containing 2 mg/ml of etomidate in an aqueous solution of 35% propylene glycol, although a lipid emulsion preparation (of equivalent strength) has also been introduced. Etomidate was originally formulated as a racemic mixture, but the R form is substantially more active than its enantiomer. It was later reformulated as a single-enantiomer drug, becoming the first general anesthetic in that class to be used clinically.

References

Further reading 

 ; discussion 67.
 
 
 ; author reply 809.

External links 
 

11β-Hydroxylase inhibitors
Belgian inventions
Chemical substances for emergency medicine
Cholesterol side-chain cleavage enzyme inhibitors
CYP17A1 inhibitors
Ethyl esters
GABAA receptor positive allosteric modulators
General anesthetics
Glycine receptor agonists
Imidazoles
Janssen Pharmaceutica
Lethal injection components